Rosa Borja Febres-Cordero (Guayaquil, July 30, 1889 – Guayaquil, December 22, 1964) known as Rosa Borja de Ycaza was an Ecuadorian writer, essayist, dramatist, sociologist, poet, novelist, feminist and activist.

Biography
Rosa Borja de Ycaza was born in Guayaquil on July 30, 1889. Her father was Dr. César Borja Lavayen, a doctor, politician, French-to-Spanish translator, and Parnasian poet who wrote "Flores tardías y joyas ajenas". Her mother was  Angela Febres-Cordero Lavayen.

Career
She was the director of the "Center for Literary Studies" at the University of Guayaquil, founder and director of the magazine Nuevos Horizontes, member of the Ecuadorian Academy of Language and the "Ecuadorian Cultural Institute", founder of the "Journalists Circle" of Guayas and vice president of the "Bolivarian Society" of Guayaquil. She was also served as Minister of Guayas province.

Works
She wrote the plays Las de Judas and Nadie sabe lo que vendrá mañana

She left an unpublished novel María Rosario and a play El espíritu manda.

She was also the author of sociological and historical essays.

She wrote songs and composed music, and in 1942 the Chamber Music Association of Buenos Aires awarded her first prize for some of her compositions with which she had competed.

Social work
She founded the "Women's Legion of Popular Culture", along with other feminists like Amarilis Fuentes

She was an advocate for women's rights and the rights of workers and employees, whom she indoctrinated with lectures and discussions.

Personal life
She married Alberto Icaza (Ycaza) in 1916 in Guayaquil.

References 

1889 births
1964 deaths
Ecuadorian novelists
20th-century Ecuadorian poets
People from Guayaquil
Ecuadorian composers
Ecuadorian essayists
Ecuadorian dramatists and playwrights
Women novelists
Ecuadorian women poets
Ecuadorian women essayists
Women dramatists and playwrights
Women classical composers
Rosa
20th-century Ecuadorian women writers
20th-century Ecuadorian writers
20th-century novelists
20th-century dramatists and playwrights
20th-century classical composers
20th-century essayists
20th-century women composers